The Pennsylvania Railroad class Q1, #6130, was a single experimental steam locomotive designed for dual service. The locomotive entered service in 1942, and retired in 1949 after accumulating a relatively low 165,000 service miles.

The Q1 had a 4-6-4-4 wheel arrangement, consisting of a four-wheel leading truck, two sets of driving wheels (six and four) in a rigid locomotive frame, and a four-wheel trailing truck. The first group of six driving wheels were powered by a pair of conventional front-mounted cylinders, while the rear four driving wheels had their cylinders mounted behind them, on either side of the firebox.

The Q1's streamlined design consisted of a blunt nosecone in front of the smokebox, extended side skirts covering the locomotive's pipework, and a streamlined shape on the tender similar to the PRR's S1, S2, and T1 passenger locomotives. The cab front was set at a rakish angle. While the overall design reduced drag compared to the PRR's existing J1 class, the streamlining was ultimately removed around 1944, due to the minimal benefits at low freight speeds, and increased maintenance costs.

The Q1 was ultimately considered a failure by both PRR and later rail historians. Between design shortcomings and high operational costs, particularly during increasing use of diesel locomotives, it was never approved for series production. Despite being designed as a dual-service locomotive, minimal evidence suggests it ever served in a passenger capacity. However, its design did inspire the moderately successful albeit short-lived PRR class Q2.

History

PRR's Board approved $595,000 for the construction of this experimental Class dual service locomotive on Oct. 9, 1940.  it was built in March 1942. Its streamlined shrouding, according to an interview of John W. Epstein, Special Projects Manager and vice president, Raymond Loewy & Assoc., was designed by Raymond Loewy, but,due to WWII, there was no publicity about it. The Q1 was a duplex locomotive; it had a wheel arrangement of 4-6-4-4, consisting of a four-wheel leading truck, two sets of driving wheels (six followed by four) in a rigid locomotive frame and a four-wheel trailing truck. The first group of six driving wheels was driven by a pair of cylinders mounted conventionally in front of them, while the rear four driving wheels were driven by cylinders mounted behind them on either side of the firebox.

The Q1's streamlining was in the form of a bluntly-pointed nosecone on the smokebox front as well as extended side skirts covering up the locomotive's pipework. The cab front was set at a rakish angle. The tender, although given a freight locomotive's "doghouse" on the rear deck for the head-end brakeman, was otherwise a streamlined affair very similar to that used on the S1, S2, and T1 passenger locomotives. Q1 was the last dual service locomotive designed by the Pennsylvania Railroad, but there is no substantial evidence showing that it was assigned to passenger service. Q1's design was able to reduce dynamic argument by 60% compared to the J1 class above 70mph, but it exceeded the railroad's 50mph speed limit for the freight train.

On April 10, 1942, H.W. Jones, Chief of Motive Power, told Altoona that the Q1, #6130, would be considered a passenger engine as far as striping and lettering were concerned. During its short service life, it spent more time in shops or the engine-house than being run, accumulating only about 165,000 service miles in its career (1942–1949). Its first revenue run occurred on May 31, 1942, from East Altoona to Enola with 125 cars and 10,000 tons; 40 mph was made on a level track at 40% cutoff. In October 1943, it was assigned to the St. Clair Avenue Enginehouse in Columbus, Ohio and ran mostly in the Ohio area and to Chicago. 

In December 1944, it appeared at a PRR exhibition in Chicago Union Station entitled "Presenting a Line of Modern Coal-Burning Steam Locomotives". At some time during the next year, it lost much of its streamlining, the nosecone being removed in favor of a conventional PRR smokebox front, including the keystone number plate placed centrally on the small smokebox door. A headlamp bracket mounted above that door also hung the locomotive's bell. The side skirting was cut back to expose pipework and fittings for easier maintenance. The skyline casing atop the boiler remained in place.

The Q1 remained in service until July 1949, after which it was placed in storage. It was dismantled around 1949 and was removed from the company's books in January 1952.

The PRR considered the Q1 design unfit for series production, and railroad historians consider it mostly a failure. The backward-driving rear cylinders were a poor choice; mounted next to the firebox, each constrained the other's size, and the area by the firebox was dusty and hot, which increased cylinder wear. These problems had previously been encountered on the B&O's N-1 duplex. The length of steam pipes required also meant a fair degree of power loss. Added to this, the passenger locomotive-sized drivers were not a good choice for freight service. 

From its experiences with this locomotive, the PRR came up with an improved design, the Q2. This had smaller drivers, cylinders mounted in front of the wheels they drove, was built largely unstreamlined and was designed for freight service only.

References

Bibliography

Citations 

4-6-4-4 locomotives
Duplex locomotives
Experimental locomotives
Freight locomotives
Individual locomotives of the United States
Q1
Scrapped locomotives
Standard gauge locomotives of the United States
Steam locomotives of the United States
Streamlined steam locomotives
Unique locomotives